Ian Douglas Day (born 9 February 1935) is a former Australian rules footballer who played for West Adelaide between 1952 and 1960, and South Adelaide between 1961 and 1964. He captained the team in 1963 and played in the 1964 Grand Final premiership under captain Neil Kerley, which was the last premiership to be won by South Adelaide.

Following his retirement from football, Day moved into the media where he became a highly respected sports presenter and football commentator in Adelaide. In 2017, Ian was inducted into the Adelaide Oval Media Hall of Fame.

Playing career 
An accomplished and combative rover, Ian Day gave good service to two league clubs in a 12-season career at the top level. He began at West Adelaide in 1952, and played a total of 67 league matches there (missing the whole of the 1953 season due to a broken leg) before crossing to South Adelaide in 1961. The timing of this move meant that he missed the opportunity later that year to participate in West’s Grand Final defeat of Norwood, but he made amends three seasons later by helping South to its first flag since 1938.

Day formed part of a powerful first ruck combination that day along with Peter Darley and Neil Kerley, and had the satisfaction of kicking the Panthers’ ninth, and final, goal of the match. It was the last of Ian Day’s 68 SANFL matches for the club. He also kicked a total of 178 goals, 80 with Westies, and 98 for South which included a club list heading tally of 35 in his last season.

Media career 
Once his playing career was over, Ian Day became, and continued for many years as, a television football commentator of note.

Ian joined Channel 7’s television commentary team in 1965 as a pioneer of League Football television coverage with Blair Schwartz and Bob Jervis. When Channel 9 secured the broadcast rights, Ian joined as its leading football commentator. Ian finished his commentary career with Channel 2’s commentary team, retiring in 1994

Ian is quoted as saying “I was extremely lucky in that the year I quit playing football was the year Channel 7 decided to televise the game. They asked me to become a commentator and when I pleaded I’d never done it before, they told me no-one had. We all learned together.”

As testament to his professionalism his colleagues offer the following: Ian felt for the players and was positive in his comments – although this did not stop him from analysing their style and passing relevant comment. Ian was never false in his presentation. Ian’s tone of voice was genuine when injecting excitement in the call. Ian was renowned for his homework when calling both League and Reserves matches. Ian prided himself on the fact that as a commentator he did not “rubbish” players and did not show personal bias.

Family Connections 
Ian Day’s younger brother Robert Day played with distinction for West Adelaide. In 1971, he moved to Victoria and signed with Hawthorn in the VFL. He was a member of that season's premiership team, playing as a half back flanker in Hawthorn's Grand Final win over St Kilda. He was replaced at half time because he was suffering from concussion.

Ian Day's grandson is Sam Day, an Australian rules footballer who plays for the Gold Coast Football Club. He was selected by the Gold Coast with the third pick in the 2010 national draft. Sam made his AFL debut against the Brisbane Lions in round 7 of the 2011 season. He kicked a career high four goals against Collingwood in 2014.

References 

South Adelaide Football Club players
West Adelaide Football Club players
Living people
1935 births
Australian rules football commentators
South Australian Football Hall of Fame inductees
Australian rules footballers from South Australia